Alsuviricetes is a class of positive-strand RNA viruses which infect eukaryotes. The name of the group is a syllabic abbreviation of "alpha supergroup" with the suffix -viricetes indicating a virus class.

Taxonomy
The following orders are recognized:
Hepelivirales
Martellivirales
Tymovirales

References

Tymovirales
Viruses